Dublin is a town in Cheshire County, New Hampshire, United States. The population was 1,532 at the 2020 census. It is home to Dublin School and Yankee magazine.

History

In 1749, the Masonian proprietors granted the town as "Monadnock No. 3" (or North Monadnock) to Matthew Thornton and 39 others. The 40 grantees came mostly from middle and eastern parts of New Hampshire; none of them became settlers in the township. The deed of grant, which dated November 3, 1749, was given by Col. Joseph Blanchard of Dunstable.

The French and Indian War thwarted permanent settlement until the 1760s, when Irishman Henry Strongman moved from Peterborough. Other early settlers arrived from Sherborn, Massachusetts. In 1771, Governor John Wentworth incorporated the town, naming it after Strongman's birthplace: Dublin, Ireland.

Like all towns in this area, the terrain features hills and valleys. Farmers found the soil hard and rocky, but with effort it yielded maize, oats, barley and potatoes, with some wheat and rye. Orchards were common. The first census, taken in 1790, reported 901 residents. By 1859, there were 1,088. In 1870, the small mill town of Harrisville voted to separate from Dublin, leaving the latter with only 455 residents during the 1880 census.

Geography
The northern slopes of Mount Monadnock occupy the southern part of town. Roughly the western half of Dublin lies within the Connecticut River watershed, drained by tributaries of the Ashuelot River, with the eastern half located in the Merrimack River watershed, drained by tributaries of the Contoocook River.

The ponds in Dublin include Monadnock Lake (now known as Dublin Pond), Farnum (Dark) Pond, and Wight Pond, as well as Howe, Knight, and Electric Company reservoirs.

Dublin Pond is a clean sheet of water that has brought many families of wealth to the area. It is surrounded by a vast area of woods leading to the edge of the summit of Mount Monadnock, and from its surface the summit and northwest sides of the mountain are visible. At the right hour on the right kind of day, the mountain is clearly reflected upon the surface of the pond.

The town is crossed by New Hampshire Route 101 and New Hampshire Route 137. NH 137 leads north  to Hancock and south  to Jaffrey.

Adjacent municipalities
 Harrisville (north)
 Peterborough (east)
 Jaffrey (south)
 Marlborough (west)

Climate

Architecture 
The history of Dublin's architecture starts with the foundation of the United States, and the development of the Federal style of architecture. The style in Dublin can be attributed to one Rufus Piper, who served as the town moderator and was a carpenter at the time. Piper was responsible for adding fans to various houses in the town, which included his own home and his grandfather's house.

Demographics

At the 2000 census, there were 1,476 people, 560 households and 417 families residing in the town. The population density was 52.7 per square mile (20.4/km2). There were 686 housing units at an average density of 24.5 per square mile (9.5/km2). The racial makeup of the town was 97.29% White, 0.34% African American, 0.54% Native American, 0.95% Asian, 0.41% from other races, and 0.47% from two or more races. Hispanic or Latino of any race were 1.15% of the population.

There were 560 households, of which 32.5% had children under the age of 18 living with them, 65.4% were married couples living together, 6.6% had a female householder with no husband present, and 25.4% were non-families. 21.1% of all households were made up of individuals, and 6.6% had someone living alone who was 65 years of age or older.  The average household size was 2.51 and the average family size was 2.89.

23.4% of the population were under the age of 18, 5.9% from 18 to 24, 25.0% from 25 to 44, 32.5% from 45 to 64, and 13.2% who were 65 years of age or older. The median age was 43 years. For every 100 females, there were 101.1 males. For every 100 females age 18 and over, there were 99.5 males.

The median household income was $52,150 and the median income for a family was $57,578. Males had a median income of $36,853 compared with $25,859 for females. The per capita income was $27,028. About 6.0% of families and 10.6% of the population were below the poverty line, including 16.8% of those under age 18 and 5.0% of those age 65 or over.

Economy

Dublin is the base for Yankee Publishing Inc., the publisher of the Old Farmer's Almanac and Yankee magazine.

Education
 Dublin School, a coeducational private boarding school, founded in 1935 by Paul W. Lehmann
 The Walden School, a summer music camp on the campus of Dublin School
 Dublin Christian Academy, founded in 1963

The visit from ‘Abdu’l‑Bahá 

In 1912, ʻAbdu'l-Bahá, the son and chosen successor of the Baháʼu'lláh, the Prophet-Founder of the Baháʼí Faith, visited Dublin for 23 days, from 25 July to 16 August, on his journey through the United States to spread the Bahá’í teachings after his release from 40 years of imprisonment. Spending the most consecutive days of his journey in Dublin, he gave many talks ranging from gender equality, the immortality of the soul, industrial and economic justice, the elimination of racial prejudice, spiritual and material education, Biblical symbolism, theology, the coming together of people from the East and the West, and other Bahá’í principles.

In Dublin, ‘Abdu’l‑Bahá stayed with Agnes Parsons, a Bahá’í socialite from Washington, DC, and a summer resident of Dublin whose home once stood on Windmill Hill Road. The first of his two high-profile addresses in Dublin was at a gathering at the Parsons' boathouse on Dublin Pond, owned now by the Dublin School, with local non-resident African-American servants who worked in town. In this gathering he spoke on the need for unity and amity between blacks and whites and announced the interracial marriage of two young Bahá’ís, Louis Gregory, an African-American lawyer, and Louisa Matthews, a white English woman, whom he had previously suggested to marry each other. This act was considered radical at the time, with interracial marriage still illegal in many states.

Asked to speak at the local Unitarian church one Sunday, an event attracting some 300 people, ‘Abdu’l‑Bahá spoke on the subject of spiritual education. The anniversary of his historic visit and address is commemorated annually by the church, known now as the Dublin Community Church. Rev. Howard Colby Ives, a Unitarian minister, wrote of that day,What His subject was I do not recall, nor does a single word of His address remain with me. My memory is all of the quiet New England church; the crowded pews, and ‘Abdu’l‑Bahá on the platform. His cream-colored robe; His white hair and beard; His radiant smile and courteous demeanor... And His voice! Like a resonant bell of finest timbre; never loud but of such penetrating quality that the walls of the room seemed to vibrate with its music.
‘Abdu’l‑Bahá spent time at the Dublin Inn, which has since been purchased and donated to the Bahá’í community as a space for gathering, prayer, meditation, and historic preservation.

Current events 
2019 is the 48th year for the Dublin Gas Engine Meet on Cricket Hill Farm, which is the longest lasting tradition in Dublin after Town Meeting. Every year, the town prepares starting in October for the Halloween events around town that occur each year.

See also

 List of Irish place names in other countries

Notable people 

 ʻAbdu'l-Bahá (1844–1921), eldest son of Baháʼu'lláh and served as head of the Baháʼí Faith, visited Dublin for 23 days
 Galen Clark (1814–1910), nature activist
 Grenville Clark (1882–1967), lawyer, nominee for Nobel Peace Prize
 Doris Haddock (1910–2010), political activist for Campaign finance reform in the United States, walked 3,000 miles across the United States giving speeches in support of this cause along the way
 Moses Mason, Jr. (1789–1866), physician, US congressman
 William Preston Phelps (1848–1923), artist, known as "the Painter of the Monadnock"
 Abbott Handerson Thayer (1849–1921), artist, naturalist, teacher
 Mark Twain (1835–1910), writer, humorist, entrepreneur, publisher, lecturer (summer resident, two years)

References

External links
 
 Dublin Public Library
 New Hampshire Economic and Labor Market Information Bureau Profile

 
Towns in Cheshire County, New Hampshire
Towns in New Hampshire